Dayton Ogden Hyde (March 25, 1925 – December 22, 2018) was an American expository author and proponent of nature conservation.

Most of his books take place in rural, agricultural settings where he spent the majority of his life. His books advocate an environmentally responsible philosophy of land management. For example, he encourages the use of wild coyotes, rather than toxic chemicals, to control mouse populations.

He was born in Marquette, Michigan, in 1925. At age 13, he began working on his uncle's ranch in Oregon, then moving on to the Cate School in Carpinteria, California, graduating with the class of 1943. He fought in the Army in World War II in the European campaign. After attending the University of California, Berkeley, majoring in English, he continued work on his uncle's ranch before marrying and starting his own ranch. The couple raised five children there. In the 1950s, one of his photographs of rodeo cowboys was chosen as the Life magazine Picture of the Week.

In 1990, he moved to the Black Hills of South Dakota, where, in addition to writing, he operated an  sanctuary for wild horses. Running Wild: The Life of Dayton O. Hyde, a documentary released in 2013, tells the story of his efforts to protect wild horses in the American West. Hyde died in December 2018 at the age of 93 in Chiloquin, Oregon.

Notable books
Home
Sandy
Yamsi
Pasture of Beyond
Don Coyote
The Major, the Poacher
Island of the Loons
The Bells of Lake Superior
Mr. Beans
Life in the Saddle
Wild Horses
Where Horses Run Free
Tributes
Strange Companion
The Last Free Man (Story of Mike Daggett and the Battle of Kelley Creek February 26, 1911)

References

External links
Hyde's website
Black Hills Wild Horse Sanctuary

1925 births
2018 deaths
American non-fiction writers
People from Carpinteria, California
People from Marquette, Michigan
Writers from Michigan